William Joseph Green Jr. (March 5, 1910 – December 21, 1963) was a Democratic member of the U.S. House of Representatives from Pennsylvania.

Biography
William J. Green was born in Philadelphia, Pennsylvania, the son of Irish immigrants.  He graduated from St. Joseph's Preparatory School, and attended St. Joseph's College, Philadelphia, PA.  He was engaged in business as an insurance broker in Philadelphia in 1937.  He served in the United States Army as a private in the Quartermaster Corps from March 22, 1944, to December 4, 1944.

He was elected to Congress in 1944, and after a defeat in the Republican landslide year of 1946, was reelected to Congress in 1948 and every two years thereafter until his death at age 53.  He had been elected Democratic City Chairman in 1953, and, in that role, held until his death, he helped solidify Philadelphia as a Democratic stronghold.

Green died of peritonitis and gall bladder complications in Philadelphia on December 21, 1963 and was interred at Holy Sepulchre Cemetery in Cheltenham Township, Pennsylvania. He was succeeded in Congress by his son, William J. Green, III, who was 25 years old at the time of his first election, and later became Mayor of Philadelphia.

The William J. Green Jr. Federal Building, on 6th and Arch Streets in Philadelphia, is named for him.

See also
 List of United States Congress members who died in office (1950–99)

References

1910 births
1963 deaths
American people of Irish descent
Burials at Holy Sepulchre Cemetery
Quartermasters
Democratic Party members of the United States House of Representatives from Pennsylvania
Deaths from peritonitis
Politicians from Philadelphia
20th-century American politicians
United States Army personnel of World War II
United States Army soldiers